Zhivko Dinchev Zhelev (born 23 July 1979 in Stara Zagora) is a retired Bulgarian football defender and currently coach of Yantra Gabrovo.

Club career

Litex
Zhelev joined Litex Lovech quite young but fought hard to get a place in the first team. He formed a formidable duet with ex-Bulgarian national defender Rosen Kirilov. However, due to a lack of strikers Zhelev was also used by managers to play as a striker for Litex and scored a lot of goals in this position. He is the defender who has scored the most goals in the whole history of Bulgarian football.

He has been considered one of the favourite players by Litex fans, due to his dedicated and selfless manner of playing, and his loyalty to the club. He has been awarded the title "The best player of Litex" in 2006.

Oţelul
On 12 July 2007, Zhelev joined Romanian club Oţelul Galaţi for a fee of €125,000

On 8 November 2009, after a game against FC Timişoara, he and his teammate Stoyan Kolev decided to leave Oţelul because of the financial situation of the club.

Steaua

On 5 January 2010, Steaua and Oţelul agree Zhelev and Ochiroşii swap deal. On 10 January 2010, Steaua signed the Bulgarian centre-back on a free transfer until June 2011.

First match in Liga I for Steaua: 20 February 2010 • Steaua-Ceahlăul 1–3.

First goal in Liga I for Steaua: 25 April 2010 • Steaua-FC Timişoara 3–3.

In June 2010, Steaua has terminated the contract with Zhelev.

Inter Baku
On 25 June 2010, Zhelev signed a one-year deal with the Azerbaijani football club Inter Baku. Thus, he joins compatriot Petar Zlatinov in the club squad.

Slavia Sofia
At the end of the 2010–11 season, Zhelev returned to Bulgaria and joined Slavia Sofia on a free transfer. He made his comeback league debut at the start of the 2011–12 season in a 1–0 defeat to Levski Sofia on 8 August. Zhelev was frozen out of the first team in October 2013 (after Asen Bukarev had been replaced as coach) and in December 2013 joined Vereya Stara Zagora in the third division of Bulgarian football.

Vereya Stara Zagora

In March 2015, Zhelev took over from Radostin Kishishev as head coach of Vereya Stara Zagora. However, his assistant Vladislav Yanush was officially registered as the manager, as Zhelev had not yet obtained the coaching license to manage in the B PFG.

Litex Lovech
In July 2016, Zhelev became the manager of Litex Lovech and coached them in the third tier of Bulgarian football.

Honours

Player
Litex Lovech
 Bulgarian A Group: 1998–99
 Bulgarian Cup (2): 2001, 2004

Head coach
Litex Lovech
 Third League: 2016–17

References

External links

1979 births
Living people
Sportspeople from Stara Zagora
Bulgarian footballers
Bulgaria international footballers
Association football defenders
PFC Beroe Stara Zagora players
PFC Litex Lovech players
PFC Litex Lovech managers
ASC Oțelul Galați players
FC Steaua București players
Shamakhi FK players
PFC Slavia Sofia players
FC Vereya players
First Professional Football League (Bulgaria) players
Liga I players
Expatriate footballers in Romania
Expatriate footballers in Azerbaijan
Bulgarian football managers
Bulgarian expatriate sportspeople in Azerbaijan